The 2002 Conference USA men's basketball tournament was held March 6–9 at the Firstar Center in Cincinnati, Ohio.

Top-seeded Cincinnati defeated Marquette in the championship game, 77–63, to clinch their third Conference USA men's tournament championship.

The Bearcats, in turn, received an automatic bid to the 2002 NCAA tournament. They were joined in the tournament by fellow C-USA members Marquette and Charlotte, both of whom earned at-large bids.

Format
Conference USA added two new teams, East Carolina and TCU, bringing total membership to fourteen. ECU was placed in the American Division, and TCU into the National Division.

Even with the league expansion, there were no new changes to the tournament format. The top four teams were given byes into the quarterfinal round while the next eight teams were placed into the first round. The two teams at the bottom of the conference standings, therefore, did not qualify for the tournament. All remaining tournament seeds were determined by regular season conference records.

Bracket

References

Conference USA men's basketball tournament
Tournament
Conference USA men's basketball tournament
Conference USA men's basketball tournament